Naukati Bay (Lingít: Nàakig̱èey) is a census-designated place (CDP) in the Prince of Wales-Hyder Census Area of the Unorganized Borough of the U.S. state of Alaska.  The population was 113 at the 2010 census, down from 135 in 2000.

Naukati Bay Subdivision East and West are located on the east side of Tuxekan Passage in Naukati Bay. The community of Naukati Bay has developed over the past 30 years from its original logging camp status to an independent community. Primary local access is via unpaved gravel logging roads. The area was extensively clear cut over the past 30 years, and the resulting regrowth is quite dense. Vegetation is typical temperate rain forest.

Climate 
The area is dominated by a cool, maritime climate. Average temperatures in the summer range from 46 to 70; winter temperatures range from 32 to 42.

Geography 
Naukati Bay is located in the Ketchikan Recording District.

Naukati Bay 

Naukati Bay is the largest indentation in the East shore of Tuxekan Passage.
Its entrance, about  North of Staney Island, is constricted by rocks and kelp, and the entire area has numerous islets, reefs, and rocks. In the narrow winding channel, 3 fathoms can be carried well in toward the head of the bay.

Naukati Creek 

History 
It was a logging camp at one time, but later was settled as an Alaska Department of Natural Resources land disposal site.

Name 
Named "Naukatee Bay" in 1904 by the U.S. Coast & Geodetic Survey, who recorded it as the local Indian name.
Local name recorded in 1949 by United States Geological Survey.

Little Naukati Bay 

Little Naukati Bay, on the East side of Tuxekan Narrows and about  North of Kauda Point, is not recommended as a small-boat anchorage. At low water its entrance is almost closed by rocks and reefs. The best water into it is the North channel. The narrows North-West of Little Naukati Bay is relatively clear and deep.

Demographics 

Naukati Bay first reported on the 1990 U.S. Census as a census-designated place (CDP).
 
As of the census of 2000, there were 135 people, 60 households, and 34 families residing in the CDP. There were 78 housing units at an average density of 16.3/sq mi (6.3/km2), and 18 vacant housing units. The racial makeup of the CDP was 86.67% White, 0.74% Black or African American, 9.63% Native American, 2.22% Asian, 0.74% from other races. 0.74% of the population were Hispanic or Latino of any race.

There were 60 households, out of which 36.7% had children under the age of 18 living with them, 36.7% were married couples living together, 6.7% had a female householder with no husband present, and 43.3% were non-families. 41.7% of all households were made up of individuals, and 5.0% had someone living alone who was 65 years of age or older. The average household size was 2.25 and the average family size was 3.03.

In the CDP, the age distribution of the population shows 32.6% under the age of 18, 1.5% from 18 to 24, 34.8% from 25 to 44, 28.9% from 45 to 64, and 2.2% who were 65 years of age or older. The median age was 37 years. For every 100 females, there were 150.0 males. For every 100 females age 18 and over, there were 160.0 males.

The median income for a household in the CDP was $27,500, and the median income for a family was $32,917. Males had a median income of $51,875 versus $0 for females. The per capita income for the CDP was $15,950. There were 6.9% of families and 9.4% of the population living below the poverty line, including no under eighteens and none of those over 64.

Culture 
Naukati residents are logging families and homesteaders. Two community non-profit associations have been organized for planning and local issue purposes. Sale of alcohol is restricted to the local package store.

Infrastructure

Water and Sewer 
Water is derived from rain catchment and several small streams. The 9 logging camp homes are connected to a piped water and sewer system with full plumbing. The 27 homesteaders collect rainwater or haul water and use outhouses. Funds have been requested to study alternatives for a treated community water source and sewage disposal system.

Refuse 
The community burns its refuse and ships the ash to Thorne Bay's landfill.

Utilities 
Electricity is provided by Alaska Power Company.

Schools 
There is one school located in the community, attended by 28 students. The school is the Naukati School, operated by Southeast Island School District.

Health Care 
Auxiliary health care is provided by Naukati EMS (629-4234).

Economy 
Small sawmills and related logging and lumber services are the sole income sources. Employment is seasonal. Naukati is a log transfer site for several smaller camps on the Island. Homesteading families arrived in the 1990s.

U.S. Census data for Year 2000 showed 39 residents as employed. The unemployment rate at that time was 29.09 percent, although 60.2 percent of all adults were not in the work force. The median household income was $27,500, per capita income was $15,949, and 9.45 percent of residents were living below the poverty level.

Transportation 
Naukati is accessed primarily by float plane or off of the North Island Road.

Notes

References

Further reading

National Oceanic and Atmospheric Administration, United States Department of Commerce

External links
 
 Alaska Division of Community Advocacy - Community Information Summary 

Bays of Alaska
Census-designated places in Alaska
Census-designated places in Prince of Wales–Hyder Census Area, Alaska
Census-designated places in Unorganized Borough, Alaska
Bays of Prince of Wales–Hyder Census Area, Alaska
Populated coastal places in Alaska on the Pacific Ocean